Hermann Schlöske (24 June 1905 – 6 January 1991) was a German sprinter. He competed in the men's 200 metres at the 1928 Summer Olympics.

References

1905 births
1991 deaths
Athletes (track and field) at the 1928 Summer Olympics
German male sprinters
Olympic athletes of Germany
Place of birth missing